The Central District of Dalgan County is a district (bakhsh) in Dalgan County, Sistan and Baluchestan province, Iran. At the 2006 census, its population was 29,775, in 5,741 families.  The district has one city: Galmurti. The district has two rural districts (dehestan): Dalgan Rural District and Hudian Rural District.

References 

Dalgan County
Districts of Sistan and Baluchestan Province